This article is about the particular significance of the year 1934 to Wales and its people.

Incumbents

Archbishop of Wales
Alfred George Edwards, Bishop of St Asaph (retired)
Charles Green, Bishop of Bangor (elected)
Archdruid of the National Eisteddfod of Wales – Gwili

Events
22 September - At Gresford Colliery in Wrexham, 265 miners are killed in a mining accident. Later in the year, Paul Robeson performs in Caernarfon in a benefit concert for victims of the accident.
23 October - Opening of the Guildhall, Swansea, designed by Percy Thomas.
24 October - Aneurin Bevan marries fellow MP Jennie Lee.
date unknown
Anthracite production in Wales reaches its peak.
The Special Areas Act is passed to help areas such as the South Wales Valleys that have been particularly affected by the Great Depression in the United Kingdom.
Courtaulds establishes a new rayon factory at Greenfield.
Tudor Thomas's work on corneal grafting restores the sight of a man who had been nearly blind for 27 years.

Arts and literature
Sir Henry Walford Davies is appointed Master of the King's Musick.
The Welsh Folk Dance Society is founded at Bala.
Caradog Prichard becomes sub-editor of the News Chronicle.
Richard Hughes and his wife move into Laugharne Castle.

Awards

National Eisteddfod of Wales (held in Neath)
National Eisteddfod of Wales: Chair - William Morris, "Ogof Arthur"
National Eisteddfod of Wales: Crown - Eirug Davies, "Y Gorwel"

New books
Edward Tegla Davies - Y Llwybr Arian
Margiad Evans - Turf or Stone
D. Gwenallt Jones - Plasau'r Brenin
Jack Jones - Rhondda Roundabout
Eiluned Lewis - Dew on the Grass
Howard Spring - Shabby Tiger
Dylan Thomas - 18 Poems (his first collection, including "The Force that Through the Green Fuse Drives the Flower")

Drama
James Kitchener Davies - Cwm Glo

Music
Harry Parr Davies becomes accompanist to Gracie Fields.

Film
Ray Milland appears in We're Not Dressing.
Gareth Hughes appears in Mrs. Wiggs of the Cabbage Patch.
Yr Ail Fordaith Gymraeg (Second Welsh Cruise), a silent film made by Ifan ab Owen Edwards focusing on the activities of Urdd Gobaith Cymru (with Welsh-language titles)

Broadcasting
A new radio station is established at Bangor.

Sport
Badminton - Wales is a founder member of the Badminton World Federation.
Cricket - Cyril Walters becomes the first Welshman to captain an England Test team
Rugby Union
10 March - Wales defeat Ireland 13–0 in a game held at St Helen's, Swansea

Births
11 February – Mary Quant, fashion designer
25 February (in London) – Nicholas Edwards, Baron Crickhowell, politician (died 2018)
28 March – Graham Vearncombe, footballer (died 1993)
30 March – Dic Jones, bard and archdruid (died 2009)
18 April – Brynmor John, politician (died 1988)
16 May – Kenneth O. Morgan, historian and academic
10 May – Cliff Wilson, snooker player (died 1994)
13 June – Gren (Grenfell Jones), cartoonist (died 2007)
5 July – Philip Madoc, actor (died 2012)
13 July – Dai Ward, footballer (died 1996)
6 August – Billy Boston, rugby league footballer
16 August – Dave Thomas, golfer and architect (died 2013)
4 September – Clive Granger, econometrician (died 2009)
19 August – Ron Jones, athlete (died 2021)
20 September – David Marquand, academic and MP
1 November – William Mathias, composer (died 1992)
6 November – Betty Campbell, née Johnson, Wales's first black head teacher (died 2017)
24 November – Dewi Zephaniah Phillips, philosopher (died 2006)
date unknown – Mary Lloyd Jones, painter and printmaker

Deaths
6 January – Dorothy Edwards, novelist, 30 (suicide)
8 January – Ivor Bowen, judge, 71
23 January – Charles McLaren, 1st Baron Aberconway, owner of Bodnant, 83
2 February – Edward Bevan, Bishop of Swansea and Brecon, 72
4 February – Harry Wetter, Welsh international rugby union player, 52
25 February – Daniel Protheroe, composer and conductor, 67
28 February – David Davies, textile merchant, 81
3 May – Courtenay Morgan, 1st Viscount Tredegar, 68
24 May – William Nathaniel Jones, politician, 76
14 June – George Thomas, Wales international rugby union player, 76/77
30 June – Hugh Evans, author and publisher, 79
19 July – Christopher Williams, painter, 61
28 August – Edgeworth David, geologist and explorer, 76
11 October – John Kelt Edwards, cartoonist, 59
13 November – Sir Evan Vincent Evans, journalist, 81
4 December – Henry Davies, cricketer, 69

References

See also
1934 in Northern Ireland